Mark Whitney Hulsbeck (born February 20, 1956) is an American professional aquanaut.  He serves as an Oceanographic Operations Field Manager and research diver for the Aquarius Reef Base, the world's only undersea research laboratory, operated by Florida International University. Hulsbeck is nicknamed "Otter".

Early life and career 
Hulsbeck was born in Cincinnati, Ohio, and grew up in Venice and Orlando, Florida.  He served in the United States Navy for five years as a helicopter rescue aircrewman.  He subsequently earned a degree in geology from the University of South Florida.  Hulsbeck then joined the National Oceanic and Atmospheric Administration Commissioned Corps, in which he served as Navigation Officer on the NOAA ship Malcolm Baldrige during its circumnavigation of the Earth.  Hulsbeck's professional qualifications include a United States Coast Guard Captain's license.  He is also a Professional Association of Diving Instructors Master Scuba Diver Trainer, an International Association of Nitrox and Technical Divers Nitrox Instructor, a Divers Alert Network Oxygen Instructor and a Dive Medical Technician.

Aquarius and NEEMO 

In October 2001, Hulsbeck took part as a habitat technician in the NASA Extreme Environment Mission Operations 1 mission (NEEMO 1), the first of a series of NASA-NOAA missions which use Aquarius as an analog environment for space exploration. The NEEMO 1 crew lived and worked underwater aboard Aquarius for seven days. In July 2006, Hulsbeck served as a habitat technician during the NEEMO 10 mission, the crew of which also lived underwater for seven days. Hulsbeck's other missions aboard Aquarius have included a June 2004 coral reef study led by Dr. James Leichter of the Scripps Institution of Oceanography and an October 2007 mission studying the role of sponges in coastal nitrogen cycles. Hulsbeck had taken part in nineteen Aquarius missions as of July 2011. In June and July 2014, Hulsbeck served as lead habitat technician aboard Aquarius during Fabien Cousteau's Mission 31 expedition, living and working underwater for 31 days.

In May 2007, Hulsbeck and other NURP/UNCW divers, including fellow Aquarius divers James Talacek and Jim Buckley, set up a coral monitoring station pylon offshore from the Discovery Bay Marine Laboratory in Discovery Bay, Jamaica, for a cooperative program among Caribbean countries called Mainstreaming Adaptation to Climate Change (MACC). The station was part of NOAA's Integrated Coral Observing Network (ICON). The station was subsequently destroyed during Hurricane Paloma in November 2008.

Personal life 
Hulsbeck enjoys reading, diving and boating.  He is married with three children and a son from a previous marriage.

Publications

Notes

External links 
 Aquarius bio (2011)
 Aquarius bio (2000)
 

1956 births
Living people
American underwater divers
Aquanauts
National Oceanic and Atmospheric Administration personnel
People from Cincinnati
People from Orlando, Florida
People from Venice, Florida
United States Navy sailors
University of North Carolina at Wilmington
University of South Florida alumni